Ximena Romo Mercado (born April 14, 1990) is a Mexican actress. She is the daughter of Mexican politician Patricia Mercado and former head of the Mexican electricians' union, Horacio Romo Vázquez. Romo is best known for her portrayal of Nora in the soap opera El color de la pasión.

Career 
Ximena Romo Mercado trained as an actress at the Casazul Artes Escénicas Argos in Mexico and then received an MA in contemporary acting from the Royal Central School of Speech and Drama of the University of London. She made her film debut in 2008 in the movie by Gerardo Naranjo, Voy a explotar, a drama in which she played the role of Lucía. Later she appeared as Maria in Oveja negra (2009), directed by Humberto Hinojosa Ozcáriz. Her next film was Amaneceres oxidados (2010), directed by Diego Cohen, in which she worked alongside actors such as Armando Hernández, Catalina López, Ari Brickman, and Alan Chávez. She was co-producer of the short film  El retrete de Elena (2010). She then appeared in the series Soy tu fan, starring Ana Claudia Talancón, in which Romo played Mila.

Filmography

Films roles

Television roles

References

External links

1990 births
Living people
Actresses from Mexico City
Mexican film actresses
Mexican telenovela actresses
Mexican television actresses
21st-century Mexican actresses